Octavian Ursu (born 15 November 1994) is a Romanian professional footballer who plays as a forward for Oțelul Galați. In his career, Ursu also played for clubs such as Universitatea Cluj, ASU Politehnica Timișoara or UTA Arad, among others.

Honours

Club
Universitatea Cluj
 Liga III: 2017–18

UTA Arad
 Liga II: 2019–20

References

External links
 
 

1994 births
Living people
People from Mediaș
Romanian footballers
Association football forwards
Liga I players
Liga II players
FC Universitatea Cluj players
AFC Unirea Slobozia players
CS Mioveni players
ASA 2013 Târgu Mureș players
FC Olimpia Satu Mare players
SSU Politehnica Timișoara players
FC UTA Arad players
FC Rapid București players
CSC 1599 Șelimbăr players
ASC Oțelul Galați players